Charles Davis Limited was a department store company established in Hobart, Tasmania in 1847 and is one of Australia's oldest companies. It had several businesses across the surrounding states in industries such as manufacturing, boating including yachts and races and hardware and electrical equipment.

The company was founded by Charles Davis, an Englishman who had been transported to the Tasmanian penal colony as a convict. He established a hardware, ironmongery and tinsmithing business which grew to become one of Tasmania's major business enterprises including moving it to Hobart's Cat and Fiddle Alley where it remained into the 1970s. Davis fully owned the company until in 1911, at age 87, when he limited himself to a chairman, and his family continued to operate the company until the 1970s. Sir Donald Trescowthick took over control of the business from the Davis family in the 1970s and the company embarked on significant expansion and diversification under his management. At various times, the company had investments in wholesaling, retailing, car distribution, property, hotels and motels and mining. In 1971, Sir Donald Trescowthick gained a majority shareholding of 54 percent through his company Signet Insurance Group, which was a company with assets of $27 million an annual turnover of $35 million and eventually renamed as Harris Scarfe Holdings Limited in 1995. The company factory and original shop closed in 1984. After the church change of name, the company focused on its department store activities and divested all other business activities.

At its height, the company was Australia's third largest retailer (November 1989), after acquiring many significant regional retailers, including Harris Scarfe, Cox Foys, FitzGerald's Department Stores, Lloyd's hardware stores, Campbell's hardware stores and McEwans.

In 1970, Charles Davis Limited negotiated with American-based Kline Iron and Steel to bring lightweight steel roofing trusses to the United States. Philips Industries of Launceston, Tasmania was acquired in 1974, giving the company presence in each of the state's three main regions, south, Burnie, Tasmania in the northwest. In 1975, Charles Davis Limited was a sponsor of the Melbourne to Hobart Yacht Race. The McEwans hardware stores group was divested in a management buyout in 1988.

At this time, the company merged its Harris Scarfe and FitzGerald's retailing operations, which continued to grow to become Australia's third largest department store group. It also once owned interests in Perpetual Insurance and Securities, owner of Eastlands Shopping Centre which increased from 83 % to 91 % in 1973-1974 and also in Co-Operative Motors Ltd, manufacturer of Toyota, Triumph Motor Company, Mercedes Benz and Rambler.

After suffering financial difficulties, the company was placed in receivership in 2001 and the Charles Davis name was bought by Davis's great-great granddaughter for $A120.

References 

 Harris Scarfe Holdings Limited Annual Report 2000.

External links
Company records and photos throughout company life
Additional photos of company interests

Companies based in Tasmania
Companies based in Hobart
Defunct department stores of Australia
Retail companies established in 1847
Retail companies disestablished in 2001
Australian companies established in 1847
Australian companies disestablished in 2001